Clifford Ormond Dolan AO (23 January 19207 December 2000) was an Australian unionist.  He was President of the Australian Council of Trade Unions from 1980 to 1985.

Early life
Dolan was born in Grafton, New South Wales, and raised in the Sydney suburb of Meadowbank.  His father was a council gardener.  He attended West Ryde Primary School and Sydney Technical High School.  He became an electrician, and rose to become a full-time official of the Electrical Trades Union by 1949; he was elected Federal Secretary in 1960.

He was Senior Vice-President of the Australian Council of Trade Unions 1973-80, and then succeeded Bob Hawke as President after Hawke went into politics.  He remained President until 1985, and was succeeded by Simon Crean.

Honours
He was appointed an Officer of the Order of Australia in 1980, "in recognition of service to trade unionism".

References
 Vale Cliff Dolan: A Lifelong Commitment, Workers Online, 8 December 2000. Retrieved 19 December 2017

1920 births
2000 deaths
Australian trade union leaders
People from Sydney
Officers of the Order of Australia